Panch phoron, panch phodan or pancha phutana is a whole spice blend, originating from the eastern part of the Indian subcontinent and used especially in the cuisine of Eastern India and Northeastern India, especially in the cuisine of Bhojpur, Mithila, Odisha, Bengal and Nepal. The name literally means "five spices".

All of the spices in panch phoron are seeds. Typically, panch phoron consists of fenugreek seed, nigella seed, cumin seed, black mustard seed and fennel seed in equal parts. Some cooks prefer to use a smaller proportion of fenugreek seeds, because of their mildly bitter taste.

See also 
 Chinese five-spice powder

References

Herb and spice mixtures
Bengali cuisine
Bangladeshi cuisine
Nepalese cuisine
Indian spices